(born Saitama Prefecture, 6 October 1968) is a Japanese former rugby union player. He played as a prop.

Career
After graduating from Daito Bunka University, where he played in the All-Japan University Rugby Championship, Oguchi joined  the Ricoh club, where he played throughout all of his career. He was first capped for Japan on 7 June 1997, against United States, in San Francisco. Oguchi was also called up in the 1999 Rugby World Cup squad coached by Seiji Hirao, playing two matches in the tournament. His last cap for Japan was against South Korea, in Aomori, on 2 July 2000.

Notes

External links
Kohei Oguchi Top League stats

1968 births
Living people
Japanese rugby union players
Black Rams Tokyo players
Sportspeople from Saitama Prefecture
Japan international rugby union players
Asian Games medalists in rugby union
Rugby union players at the 1998 Asian Games
Asian Games silver medalists for Japan
Medalists at the 1998 Asian Games
Rugby union props